Umbrărești is a commune in Galați County, Western Moldavia, Romania with a population of 6,628 people. It is composed of six villages: Condrea, Salcia, Siliștea, Torcești, Umbrărești, and Umbrărești-Deal.

Umbrărești-Deal was established in 1933 as Generalul Eremia Grigorescu. During the early communist regime, the name was changed to Vasile Roaită in 1950; this remained until 1996 when the present name was assigned.

References

Communes in Galați County
Localities in Western Moldavia
Populated places established in 1933
1933 establishments in Romania